XML Data Package (XDP) is an XML file format created by Adobe Systems in 2003. It is intended to be an XML-based companion to PDF. It allows PDF content and/or Adobe XML Forms Architecture (XFA) resources to be packaged within an XML container.

Several products by Adobe, most notably its LiveCycle ES Suite, use files in XDP format.

XDP is XML 1.0 compliant. The XDP may be a standalone document or it may in turn be carried inside a PDF document.

XDP provides a mechanism for packaging form components within a surrounding XML container. An XDP can also package a PDF file, along with XML form and template data. When the XFA (XML Forms Architecture) grammars used for an XFA form are moved from one application to another, they must be packaged as an XML Data Package. The format of an XFA resource in PDF is described by the XML Data Package Specification. The types of XDP content defined in XFA specification include PDF, XFA template, XML configuration information (XCI), dataSet, sourceSet, XSLT style sheet, XFDF (form data) and undocumented packets (such as those used to communicate events to a Form Server).

References

External links
 Adobe XML Forms Architecture (XFA)
 XML Data Package Specification from Adobe Systems (version 2.0 As of January 2007)

Computer file formats